Andrei Prepeliță (born 8 December 1985) is a Romanian professional football manager and former player, who played mainly as a defensive midfielder.

Club career
Andrei Prepeliță was born on 8 December 1985 in Slatina and started playing organized football under the guidance of his father, Constantin at CȘS Slobozia. He completed his junior years at Argeș Pitești, being brought there by Viorel Moiceanu, making his debut for the first team when coach Ion Moldovan sent him on the field on 7 May 2003 in a Liga I match which ended with a 1–0 loss against Gloria Bistrița. After playing 112 Liga I matches in which he scored 11 goals, Prepeliță was transferred by Argeș Pitești together with teammate Ciprian Tănasă to 
Universitatea Craiova for 1.5 million €. After 7 goals scored in 120 Liga I matches played for Universitatea Craiova over the course of four seasons, on 2 August 2011, Prepeliță signed a four-year contract with Steaua București. During his period of four seasons spent at Steaua București, Prepeliță won three titles, one cup, one league cup and one supercup. On 1 July 2015, he signed a two-year contract with Ludogorets Razgrad in Bulgaria, where he played alongside fellow Romanians Cosmin Moți and Claudiu Keșerü, winning the Bulgarian league title. He joined Russian Premier League club Rostov on 31 August 2016 where he spent one season in which he scored one goal in 25 games played in all competitions. He returned to Romania in February 2018, signing a contract with Concordia Chiajna, where he reunited with the coach that gave him his senior debut, Ion Moldovan. On 6 September 2019, Prepeliță rejoined Argeș Pitești, which was playing in Liga II, helping the team gain promotion to Liga I where he played in the first part of the 2020–21 season, after which he retired. Andrei Prepeliță has a total of 327 Liga I matches played in which he scored 29 goals and a total of 40 appearances in European competitions with one goal scored.

International career
Andrei Prepeliță played 14 games for Romania, making his debut under coach Victor Pițurcă, when he came as a substitute and replaced Ovidiu Hoban in the 84th minute of a Euro 2016 qualification match which ended with a 1–0 away victory against Greece. Prepeliță played a total of five games at the Euro 2016 qualifiers, being selected by coach Anghel Iordănescu to be part Romania's squad at the Euro 2016 final tournament in which he made his last appearance for the national team in a 1–1 against Switzerland.

Managerial career
In December 2020, it was announced that Andrei Prepeliță will be the manager of Argeș Pitești. In the 2021-22 season, he managed to take the team in play-off for the first time ever, finishing on the 6th place. On 26 October 2022, his contract was terminated.

Personal life
His father, Constantin was also a footballer who appeared in 200 Liga I games and scored 32 goals for Olt Scornicești. Andrei was coached by his father while he was a junior player at CȘS Slobozia.

Career statistics

Club

International

Managerial statistics

Honours
Steaua București
Liga I: 2012–13, 2013–14, 2014–15
Cupa României: 2014–15
Supercupa României: 2013
Cupa Ligii: 2014–15
Ludogorets Razgrad
Bulgarian A Group: 2015–16
Bulgarian Supercup runner-up: 2015

References

External links

1985 births
Living people
Sportspeople from Slatina, Romania
Romanian footballers
Association football midfielders
Liga I players
Liga II players
FC Argeș Pitești players
FC U Craiova 1948 players
FC Steaua București players
CS Concordia Chiajna players
First Professional Football League (Bulgaria) players
PFC Ludogorets Razgrad players
Russian Premier League players
FC Rostov players
Romania youth international footballers
Romania under-21 international footballers
Romania international footballers
UEFA Euro 2016 players
Romanian expatriate footballers
Expatriate footballers in Bulgaria
Romanian expatriate sportspeople in Bulgaria
Expatriate footballers in Russia
Romanian expatriate sportspeople in Russia
Romanian football managers
FC Argeș Pitești managers